Daniel Pippen (born November 12, 1997) is an American professional basketball player for Kobrat of the Finnish Korisliiga. He played college basketball for the Kent State Golden Flashes.

High school career
Pippen attended Allen Academy in Detroit, Michigan and played alongside Rocket Watts. As a junior, he averaged 16 points and eight rebounds per game. Pippen averaged 12.8 points and 12.5 rebounds per game as a senior, earning First Team Class C honors. He finished as Allen's career leader in blocks with 174. Pippen committed to playing college basketball for Kent State.

College career
Pippen came off the bench as a freshman and averaged 3 points and 2.7 rebounds per game. As a sophomore, he averaged 8.1 points, 6.8 rebounds and 1.6 blocks per game. Pippen sat out the 2018–19 season as a redshirt after undergoing microfracture surgery on his right knee. During his junior season, he played through pain due to a torn meniscus on his other knee, and only missed one game against Buffalo due to a back problem. Pippen averaged 14.3 points, 7.1 rebounds and 1.5 blocks per game, earning Honorable Mention All-MAC accolades. He underwent microfracture surgery on his left knee in March 2020. On January 5, 2021, Pippen scored a career-high 34 points to go with 16 rebounds and four blocks in an 84–82 loss to Toledo. He tied his career-high of 34 points on January 27, to go with 11 rebounds and surpassed 1,000 points in a 96–91 win against Bowling Green. As a senior, Pippen averaged 19.3 points, 8.7 rebounds and 1.3 blocks per game, and led the MAC in double-doubles with nine. He was named to the First Team All-MAC.

Professional career
In October 2021, Pippen joined the Greensboro Swarm of the NBA G League after a successful tryout. He appeared in one game for the Swarm before being waived on December 17, 2021. He was acquired by the Maine Celtics on December 19, played in two games for the team, and was then waived again on December 21.

On January 29, 2022, Pippen signed with Lavrio of the Greek Basket League. He appeared in three games for Lavrio between January 30 and March 6.

On August 25, 2022, Pippen signed with Kobrat of the Finnish Korisliiga. He is set to join the Manawatu Jets in New Zealand for the 2023 NBL season.

Career statistics

College

|-
| style="text-align:left;"| 2016–17
| style="text-align:left;"| Kent State
| 29 || 12 || 10.0 || .397 || .259 || .594 || 2.7 || .2 || .2 || .6 || 3.0
|-
| style="text-align:left;"| 2017–18
| style="text-align:left;"| Kent State
| 33 || 23 || 21.8 || .409 || .355 || .803 || 6.8 || .6 || .4 || 1.6 || 8.1
|-
| style="text-align:left;"| 2018–19
| style="text-align:left;"| Kent State
| style="text-align:center;" colspan="11"|  Redshirt
|-
| style="text-align:left;"| 2019–20
| style="text-align:left;"| Kent State
| 31 || 28 || 29.0 || .406 || .326 || .772 || 7.1 || 1.7 || .4 || 1.5 || 14.3
|-
| style="text-align:left;"| 2020–21
| style="text-align:left;"| Kent State
| 20 || 19 || 31.9 || .403 || .308 || .806 || 8.7 || 2.8 || .8 || 1.3 || 19.3
|- class="sortbottom"
| style="text-align:center;" colspan="2"| Career
| 113 || 82 || 22.5 || .405 || .322 || .771 || 6.1 || 1.2 || .4 || 1.3 || 10.5

Personal life
Pippen is the son of Tiffaney Reeves. As of December 2020, his father was imprisoned at the Chillicothe Correctional Institution on a drug trafficking conviction.

References

External links
Kent State Golden Flashes bio

1997 births
Living people
American men's basketball players
American expatriate basketball people in Finland
American expatriate basketball people in Greece
Basketball players from Detroit
Greensboro Swarm players
Kent State Golden Flashes men's basketball players
Lavrio B.C. players
Maine Celtics players
Power forwards (basketball)